KNAV-LD, virtual and UHF digital channel 22, is a low-powered LATV-affiliated television station licensed to Dallas, Texas, United States and serving the Dallas–Fort Worth Metroplex. The station is owned by HC2 Holdings.

History
KNAV-LD was originally started in Corsicana, Texas on August 23, 1983 as a station run by Navarro College. It was originally assigned the callsign K29AD. On November 16, 1989, the station moved to channel 30 and the new callsign of K30DG. On February 1, 1995, the callsign was changed to KNAV-LP, with "NAV" reflecting NAVarro College's ownership.

KNAV-LP was sold in 2004 to Tuck Properties. Tuck moved the transmitter so the station could serve the Dallas-Fort Worth television market.

The station moved from channel 29 to 30 around the time that KMPX was granted a construction permit for a full-power station on channel 29. It later moved to channel 22 after KMPX was granted channel 30 as its digital television channel.

After KNAV-LP's move to DeSoto, it became the Almavision affiliate, showing Spanish religious programming. However, in mid-2006, KNAV-LP abandoned Almavision in favor of the new locally produced Genesis Television Network. Despite different owners, KNAV-LP and Mako Communications-owned KHPK-LP maintained a partnership as KHPK broadcast the English version of Genesis TV.

When K31GL switched from analog to digital broadcasting in November 2008, Genesis moved from KHPK and KNAV-LP to K31GL. KHPK began broadcasting K31GL's former infomercial format, but KNAV-LP was left without programming until December, when KNAV-LP began broadcasting Gems TV programming.

In January 2009, KNAV-LP changed formats again when KHPK began broadcasting in digital on channel 3. Gems TV moved to KHPK-LD's main channel, and the infomercials which had moved from K31GL to KHPK moved yet again to KNAV-LP.

Although KNAV-LP was not required to turn off its analog signal on June 12, 2009 which was the end of the digital TV conversion period for full-service stations, KNAV-LP quietly went off the air in early November 2009. On June 19, 2009, KNAV-LP applied for a construction permit for UHF channel 29; however, full-power station KTXA had also applied for a construction permit for channel 29 and received the grant. On February 17, 2010 (BEP-20100217AAV), the FCC granted an extension of time to complete the digital construction permit. Tuck Properties, Inc. (the owner) applied for a "digital flash cut" with an ERP of 750 watts on channel 22 on May 25, 2010, but that application was dismissed on July 13, 2010.

Tuck Properties was finally granted a construction permit on October 18, 2010 for "Digital Flash Cut" on channel 22 with an ERP of 10 kW and a transmitter power of 1.2 kW. On May 18, 2011, Tuck Properties was granted a modification of the construction permit to change the ERP to 15 kW and the transmitter power will be 1.5 kW. However, as of January 2012, KNAV-LP had still not begun broadcasting in digital. With their authority to remain off the air expiring, KNAV-LP returned to the airwaves as an analog station broadcasting Hot TV.

Tuck Properties sold its stations, including KNAV-LP, to HC2 Holdings in 2017.

In March 2020, it was announced that KNAV-LP would be adding Cheddar News to DT2.

On July 30, 2020, KNAV-LP began broadcast in digital, originally with Jewelry TV and 3ABN programming, before switching to a mostly infomercial lineup. The station was licensed for digital operation on February 3, 2021, with its community of license moving from DeSoto to Dallas.

Digital television

Digital channels
The station's signal is multiplexed:

References

External links

Television stations in Texas
Television channels and stations established in 1984
Innovate Corp.
Low-power television stations in the United States
1984 establishments in Texas